Tribigild (399) was an Ostrogothic general whose rebellion against the Eastern Roman Empire precipitated a major political crisis during the reign of Emperor Arcadius.

Tribigild appears in the historical record as the leader of a colony of Ostrogoths in Nakoleia, Phrygia and a military confederate of the Roman state (with the rank of comes or count) during a period when his people lived under the dominance of the Huns. In 399, his honour wounded by an insufficiently extravagant reception at the imperial court in Constantinople, he broke with Arcadius and began to sack the interior of Asia Minor. The resulting population upheavals and rumours of Tribigild's increasing power forced Arcadius's prime minister, the eunuch Eutropius, to send an expeditionary force across the Hellespont. In fact, Tribigild had met with increasing difficulty in fending off peasant militias, but when the imperial legions arrived he was easily able to subvert the loyalty of the fellow barbarians that were the fighting core of the force and scatter the rest.

This left fellow Goth Gainas in control of Constantinople's military fate; sent against Tribigild (who may have been a kinsman), he returned to report that the rebel was insurmountable and that negotiation would be the safest tactic. A demand for the lifeblood of Eutropius, perhaps negotiated in advance by Gainas and Tribigild, was met. But Gainas soon overplayed his hand and allied openly with his rebel cousin, and Tribigild was apparently killed during the combined Gothic army's movement toward Constantinople.

Sources
A. Richard Diebold Center for Indo-European Language and Culture 
Noel Lenski, review of Wolfgang Hagl's Arcadius Apis Imperator: Synesios von Kyrene und sein Beitrag zum Herrscherideal der Spätantike, Bryn Mawr Classical Review, 98.3.08 
Biography of John Chrysostom from Smith's Greek and Roman Biography and Mythology 
Gibbon's Decline and Fall of the Roman Empire, vol. 3 
Arcadius page at romanemperors.org 

4th-century Gothic people
Byzantine generals
Byzantine rebels
Gothic warriors
400 deaths
Comites
4th-century Byzantine people
Year of birth unknown
Ancient rebels